Rajendra II  (997 CE - 1064 CE) often referred to as Rajendradeva Chola was a Chola emperor who reigned from 1052 CE to 1064 CE.   He was made  Rajendra succeeded his brother Rajadhiraja I after his death at the Battle of Koppam. Rajendra had served as a Co-regent under his brother from 1044 CE to 1052 CE. When he acceded the throne, the Chola Empire was at its peak stretching from Southern India to Vengai(Bengal) to parts of Southeast Asia.  Rajendra has maintained the territories of his predecessor. During his reign, the Chola Empire was prosperous and had a large influence in trade throughout the Indian Ocean.

As a prince Rajendra helped put down revolts in Pandya Nadu and Srivijaya. During his early reign put down several rebellions in Sri Lanka, Rajendra also straightened chola influence and control in Ruhuna in southern Sri Lanka. He established several garrisons and governors to maintain stronger rule and prevent future revolts.

In early 1052, the Cholas were suffering from losses against the Western Chalukyas in the Battle of Koppam after the death of Rajadhiraja I. Rajendra's strong leadership led the Cholas to a strategic victory although the western chalukyas achieved a Tactical victory. The Cholas didn't lose territory during this battle. Conflicts with the Western chalukyas continued throughout his reign. Rajendra's forces were victorious in the Battle of Kudal-Sangamam leading to greater Chola influence in the Krishna river.

Early life and Accession 
Rajendra II was born around 997 CE although his exact birthdate is unknown. He was born to Rajendra I and his wife Mukkokilan Adigal. He was the 5th oldest out of 9 children. As a prince, Rajendra helped put down several rebellions Pandya Nadu and Srivijaya. he also helped his father conquer the kingdoms of Polonnaruwa and Ruhuna bringing all of Sri Lanka under Chola rule.  After his father's death in 1044, Rajendra served as a Co-regent under his brother Rajadhiraja I who ascended the throne. Rajadhiraja was later killed in the Battle of Koppam in 1052. Rajendra was made king as Rajadhiraja's children were too young and inexperienced. Since he ascended the throne during a time of war, Jayamkondar’s Kalingattuparani describes him as "The one who wore the crown on the big battlefield."

Several Prashasti

It is to be noted however the above version of the Koppam battle is found only in the Chola inscriptions. A Chalukyan account of the battle is only found in a later inscription dated c. 1071, which recounts this incident after a gap of almost 15 years and which only mentions the death of Rajadhiraja.

Revolts in Sri Lanka 
Under the reign or Rajendra's father Rajendra I, The kingdom of Ruhuna were annexed bringin all of Sri lanka under Chola occupation.  During this time, the Tamil trading guilds Thisaiayiratthu Annuruvar tarded in Anuradhapura further increased their activities in the Island. Under Rajendra II, several garrisons and governors were established to maintain stronger rule. Rajendra also pushed for tighter control over Ruhuna where several revolts took place.

However this period was also met with revolts by the local Sinhalese People. Rajendra put down several early rebellions and further straightened Chola rule in the island. In 1055 Sinhalese prince Vijayabahu I, who later became the king of Polonnaruwa attempted to expel Chola forces. Gradually the wider conflict developed into a prolonged, back and forth struggle of raids and counter-raids, with the forces of Vijayabahu advancing upon Polonnaruwa and then falling back to fortresses in Dakkhinadesa and Rohana to withstand retaliatory Chola attacks and sieges. By 1058, Rohana became independent of chola occupation. Vijayabahu  established himself in Wakirigala and organized his army his army for a fresh attempt to capture Polonnaruwa, however this failed and his troops were defeater by Rajendra's son Uttama.  During this time, he also had to face rebellions from other Sinhala leaders fighting for the throne.

Rajendra eventually sent forces to Sri lanka to counter the revolt. Rajendra's son Uttama, the Chola governor of Polonnaruwa expelled Vijayabahu's forces. He also Chola troops arrived at Ruhuna which was the center of Vijayabahu's rebels. Several clashes continues between the rebels and Chola forces. Rajendra and Uttama eventually put down the revolt. Ruhana was recaptured by the Cholas. for the next few decades, Ruhana became a subordinate of the Cholas. Chola governor Uttama ruled over Ruhna indirectly and Vijayabahu became a puppet ruler under Chola influence.

Battle of Koppam 

The Chola forces were in battle with the Chalukyan army at Koppam (Koppal) located on the Tungabhadra River in 1053–54 AD. Rajadhiraja I was personally leading the Chola army from atop a war elephant to help rally the retreating Cholas. Prince Rajendra, the younger brother of Rajadhiraja, was holding himself in reserve. The Chalukyan army then concentrated on the elephant on which the Chola king was riding and wounded him mortally. Seeing the emperor falling dead, the Chola army retreated in disarray. At that stage Rajendra entered the fray. Once again the Chalukya army concentrated on the leader. Rajendra-II was as valorous as his brave father and was a born leader of men. He immediately sensed that with the death of their King Rajadhiraja-I, the Chola army was in a disarray, he announced his taking over as the next Chola monarch and ordered the capable Chola army to continue fighting without letting up. Needless to add, the Chalukya army was simply unprepared for this kind of a reaction from any army which had lost its original leader and were simply no match. From inscriptions of Rajendra-II, we know that his elder brother Rajadhiraja-I was killed in the battle at Koppam in which Rajendra-II had participated along with his other brothers. Even Rajendra-II had been injured initially and had withdrawn from the battle, but he came back and turned the tables on the Ahavamalla (Someshvara-I) who called himself 'Trailokyamalla' – lord of three worlds). From an inscriptions of his from Manimangalam we understand that at the end of the battle, the Chalukyas were defeated and a number of officers of their army lay dead on the field. In this battle multiple opponents viz. Jaysinghan, the younger brother of the Salukki, Pulikesi, Dasapanman etc., were killed by Rajendra.

An inscription from 1058 CE on the south wall of the Brihadisvara Temple in Thanjavur mentions the Battle of Koppam: 

Ottakoothar's Vikrama Cholan Ula mentions:

Kollapuram is identified with Kolhapur in present-day Maharashtra. Based upon other inscriptions of Rajendra,  historian Hultzsch has proposed that the Kollapuram war was an earlier expedition, in which Rajendra had participated under his elder brother Rajdhiraja. This view is also held by a few other historians who credit the burning of Kalyanapuram, the capital of the Chalukyas and the planting of victory at Kollapuram, again two separate events, to Rajadhiraja Chola I.

Further Chalukyan Battles 

Chalukyas, anxious to wipe out the disgrace of Koppam, invaded the Chola country in great force c 1062 C.E. The armies met at the Muddakaru river (at the junction of the Tungabhadra and the Krishna river). The Chalukya commander Dandanayaka Valadeva was killed and the Cholas led by Rajamahendra resisted the invasion. Virarajendra Chola was also present in the battle fighting at the side of Rajamahendra.

The Western Chalukyan expedition to take Vengi was also thwarted by the Cholas at the same battlefield.  Subsequently, Someshwara-I also engaged the Chola army under Rajendra-II and Virarajendra at Kudalasangamam, the result was yet another heavy defeat for the Chalukyan king.

Patron of Art
When he was a co-regent of his elder brother, Rajadhiraja Chola I, he shared the latter's workload by taking care of the internal affairs of the state. He was a great patron of dance and theatre and we know of several occasions where he encouraged various artists and poets. For example, he passed a royal order in 1056 CE to provide paddy and other ration to Santi Kuttan Tiruvalan Tirumud Kunran alias Vijaya Rajendra Acharyan(named after Rajadhiraja) for enacting RajaRajeswara Natakam (a musical), in the Brihadeeswarar Temple, Thanjavur. Accordingly, the dancer was to get 120 Kalam paddy for this purpose and that he and his descendants were to perform the musical regularly during the annual festival.

Ulagalantha Perumal Temple 
Ulagalantha Perumal Temple in Tirukoilur was expanded during rajendra's reign. According to an inscription dating to 1058 CE, the central shrine(gopuram) of the temple, which was built partly of brick, had cracked. The local governor Ranakesari Rama insisted that the shrine should be reconstructed which rajendra had agreed. The new shrine was constructed from fine black granite, a stronger and more durable material. This was so the shrine would last longer without constant repair and reconstruction. five stupas were also built enclosing the verandah and a mandapa in front of the temple. The central deity was also decorated with pearls. This straightened the foundation of the temple allowing it to last to this day.

Agastheeswar temple 

Rajendra had granted the town of Ulakkaiyur 100 kalanjus of gold to build a stone temple.  This temple, known as the Agastheeswar Temple, was dedicated to Shiva. an inscription from 1137 states that the temple was built by the residents of Ulakkaiyur. Initially the temple construction was stopped in the middle. the amount of gold rajendra granted was not entirely used on the construction of the temple. The servants of the temple also complained about mistreatment by the villagers. Rajendra was unhappy about this. He alter convinced the residents of to complete the foundational work of the temple and install an Idol of Somaskandar, a form of shiva.

Other temples and inscriptions 
Rajendra expanded the Veetrirundha Perumal Temple in 1059. He briefly renamed it Vinnamangalam after his birth name Vikrama. He also issued 120 kalams of paddy Brihadisvara Temple in Thanjavur for an reenactment play known as "Rajarajesvara nata-kam" about the conquests of Rajaraja I.

Family

A number of his relatives are known to us from a record of his from the fourth year of his reign. These are a paternal uncle, four younger brothers, six sons and two grandsons. One of these younger brothers was Virarajendra Chola on whom he conferred the title Karikala solan. Other titles conferred on the members of the royal family by the king include Chola-Pandyan, Chola-Gangan, Chola-Ayodhyarajan and Chola-Kanyakubjan. According to historian Nilakanta Sastri, these titles denoted the provinces that were administered by these Chola princes.

Conquests
Rajendra-II like his predecessors already had control of the Pandyan kingdom. After vanquishing the Chalukya Someshvara I, he undertook a further expedition to the Kalinga Kingdom as well as to Ilangai (Sri Lanka) whose king Manabharanan was aided by the Kalinga King Vira Salamegha. He also had under his control other provinces such as Ayodhya, Kanyakubja, Rattapadi, Kadaram.

An inscription in the 10th year of the reign of Rajendra Chola II is found on a Menhir in Meppara near Rajkumari, idukki, Kerala. The inscription is highly damaged. The name of the King is said to be Rajendra and the prasasti of the King mentions Irattappadi ezharai and the battle with Ahavamalla on the banks of "Periyar" ie the river Thungabhadra.

Notes

References 

 Nilakanta Sastri, K.A. (1935). The CōĻas, University of Madras, Madras (Reprinted 1984).
 Nilakanta Sastri, K.A. (1955). A History of South India, OUP, New Delhi (Reprinted 2002).
 The History and Culture of the Indian People: The struggle for empire By Ramesh Chandra Majumdar, Bhāratīya Itihāsa Samiti
 Ancient Indian History and Civilization By Sailendra Nath Sen
 Epigraphia Carnatica, Volume 10, Part 1 By Benjamin Lewis Rice, Mysore (India : State). Archaeological Dept, Mysore Archaeological Survey
 The early history of the Deccan, Volume 1 By Ghulām Yazdānī
 Sri Varadarajaswami Temple, Kanchi: A Study of Its History, Art and Architecture By K.V. Raman
 The Chālukyas of Kalyāṇa and the Kalachuris By Balakrishnan Raja Gopal
 Epigraphia Indica and record of the Archæological Survey of India, Volume 7 By Archaeological Survey of India
 Bharatanatyam, the Tamil heritage By Lakshmi Viswanathan
 Middle Chola temples: Rajaraja I to Kulottunga I (A.D. 985–1070) By S. R. Balasubrahmanyam
 Archaeology and art: Krishna Deva felicitation volume, Part 2 By Krishna Deva, Chitta Ranjan Prasad Sinha, Bipin Kumar Jamuar, Umesh Chandra Dwivedi, Shri Bhagwan Singh

Chola kings
11th-century Indian monarchs